The FIBA Europe Young Women's Player of the Year Award was an annual Player of the Year (POY) award given by FIBA Europe, the European division of FIBA World, the international governing body of the sport of basketball, to the best female basketball player with European citizenship, aged 22 and under of the year. The inaugural award was given out in the year 2005 to Anete Jēkabsone of Latvia. The award was a calendar year by calendar year award, and was not a season by season award. The vote was decided upon by a panel of basketball experts and also by fan voting.

Winners

See also 
 FIBA Europe Women's Player of the Year Award

References

External links 
FIBA Europe Women's Player of the Year Award at fibaeurope.com

FIBA Europe
European basketball awards
Awards established in 2005
Awards disestablished in 2014